This is a list of Scottish National Party MSPs. It includes all Members of the Scottish Parliament (MSPs) who represented the Scottish National Party in the Scottish Parliament.

List of MSPs

Notes

References

External links
 Current and previous Members of the Scottish Parliament (MSPs), on the Scottish Parliament website
 Scottish National Party

SNP
List